Ronald Hutcherson (April 4, 1943 – August 25, 2022) was an American NASCAR Winston Cup Series and ARCA driver whose career spanned from 1972 to 1979. He was the brother of NASCAR race winner and IMCA champion Dick Hutcherson. Engine builder Parker Nall built most of the engines that Hutcherson would use to win his races.

Career

NASCAR
Hutcherson completed 1,521 laps (2974.7 miles) in his NASCAR career. He averaged a 16th place starting position and an estimated average finish of 25th. His NASCAR career earnings totaled $52,645.

Hutcherson's best Winston Cup results came on restrictor plate tracks, where his career average was 21st-place, and his worst results came at certain intermediate tracks where he averaged 40th place. According to his results, his best track was Talladega Superspeedway, while Rockingham Speedway was his worst. Driving the #57 Ford McClure Motors vehicle for Alfred McClure was his primary ride during his career. Other teams that Hutcherson competed for include Donlavey Racing and A. J. Foyt Enterprises.

ARCA
Hutcherson would also find success in the ARCA racing series based in the Midwestern United States.

One of his most triumphant years would be 1977 where he would defeat Jim Sauter by half a car length in a 200-mile race after his Winston Cup Series car was declared ineligible to compete in a nearby NASCAR race that day. During this era, his ARCA vehicle was perfectly legal for NASCAR but his NASCAR vehicle did not fill the valid template. Many of the top-level NASCAR teams, like those employing Darrell Waltrip and Cale Yarborough at the time, were fined $250 for having fuel tanks that did not meet the specifications for NASCAR during that time.

References

External links

1943 births
2022 deaths
American Speed Association drivers
NASCAR drivers
People from Keokuk, Iowa
Racing drivers from Iowa
A. J. Foyt Enterprises drivers